Bonnie Ginzburg Erbé (born April 2, 1954) is an American journalist and television host based in Washington, D.C.

Biography
Bonnie Ginzburg Erbé graduated from the New Lincoln School and attended Barnard College, where she received her bachelor's degree. She later received her MSJ from Columbia University School of Journalism, and her J.D. from Georgetown University cum laude.

She began her journalist career in 1975, as a correspondent for United Press International, serving to 1989. In 1989, Erbé left United Press International to become a mutual correspondent for NBC/Mutual Radio and served from 1989 to 1998. In 1992, Erbé became the moderator for the half-hour weekly news analysis program, To the Contrary, which deals primarily (but not exclusively) with women's issues. The program has won multiple Gracie and Clarion awards, and many others. In 1996, Erbé took the show to the newly formed Persephone Productions. She was a contributing editor at USNews.com, the website of U.S. News & World Report, where she wrote for the Thomas Jefferson Street blog, and also wrote a syndicated newspaper column for 20 years for the Scripps Howard News Service which won multiple journalism awards.

References

External links
 To the Contrary with Bonnie Erbé Erbé's PBS program
 Erbé's blog at USNews.com

1954 births
Living people
American bloggers
American radio personalities
American women writers
Barnard College alumni
Columbia University Graduate School of Journalism alumni
Georgetown University Law Center alumni
Journalists from Washington, D.C.
American women bloggers
21st-century American non-fiction writers
American women television journalists
21st-century American women writers
American radio reporters and correspondents
American newspaper reporters and correspondents